Kaulas Fort (Kowlas Fort) is a historic fort in western Telangana in India. It was constructed by Rashtrakutas in the 9th century CE. It later came under the rule of Chalukyas of Badami, the Kakatiyas, Musunuri Nayaks, Bahmani Sultanate, Qutub Shahis, Mughals, Marathas and, finally, the Asaf Jahi rulers of the Hyderabad State. It is in the Kamareddy district, near the trijunction of Telangana, Karnataka and Maharashtra states. It has historically served as a strategic outpost contested by many kingdoms.

History

The history of the fort dates back to the 9th century AD. According to historians, it was built in Indra IV’s period of the Rashtrakuta dynasty in their political capital and was later captured by the Chalukyas of the Kalyani dynasty in the third quarter of the 10th century before it was captured by the Kakatiyas in the 12th century.

The Kakatiya kingdom, which ruled from present day Warangal, held the Kowlas Fort till 1323 AD, a period more or less parallel to the one and only Kakatiya woman ruler, Rani Rudrama Devi. Later, the Kowlas region is said to have come under the rule of the Bahmanis, Qutb Shahis, Yadavas, Naikwaries, Mughals, Devagiri, Kalyani, Marathas, etc and finally under the Asaf Jahis (Nizams) (1724 to 1948).

Aurangzeb appointed Raja Pathamsingh Gaur as governor of Kaulas for this province. His descendants Asaf Jahi were vassals of the Nizam kings and played an important role in the protection of their kingdom. In 1724,

The Nizams appointed Raja Gopal Singh Gaur, a Kshatriya or Rajput,  as the Chief of Kowlas in the 1720s. Along with Koulas, Kantar and Mahur forts in Maharashtra were also under his control . Initially this family lived in Kantar. Gopal Singh's descendants ruled the kingdom of Kaulas until 1915. Raja Deep Singh played a leading role in the Sepoy Mutiny of 1857 and was sentenced to three years imprisonment by the British. The Nizam canceled his inam and restored the kingdom to his son. The last king, Durjan Singh, died prematurely, and in 1915 the institution was declared Khalsa (meaning directly under the rule of the Nizam ). The annual revenue of the institution was then 22,517 rupees. 

It is said that after the declaration of Kowlas village as a Khalsa, the Nizams placed the village under supervision of Maulvi Jamaluddin Sheikh, a Turkish zamindar (landlord) and his sons until the Partition of India.

History of the village 
Kaulas has the ruins of an ancient fort dating back to the Kakatiya period. There are many caves on the nearby hill. Anantagiri Temple, Kalyanaramadasu Mandir and Shankaracharya Temple are famous temples in Kaunas.  Kaulas original name is Kailasa Durgam. It became popular in recent times as Muslim rulers called it Kaulas. After the end of the Kakatiya Empire , the Bahmani Sultans captured Kaulas Durga. Several battles were fought between the Bahmanis and the Musunuri chieftains centered around Kaulas Durga . Hasan Gangu gave the Koulas fort to the Kapaya leader and concluded a truce.

Village population 
According to the 2011 India census, the village is spread over 1850 hectares with 491 houses and a population of 2186. The number of males in the village is 1178, the number of females is 1008. The number of scheduled castes is 328 while the number of scheduled tribes is 170. The census location code of the village is 571106  .Pin code: 503305.

References 

Tourist attractions in Telangana
History of Telangana
Forts in Telangana
Medieval India
Hyderabad State
Archaeological sites in Telangana
Populated places established in the 9th century
Kamareddy district